Progress Party may refer to:

Active parties
 Progress Party (Denmark)
 Progress Party of Equatorial Guinea
 Gabonese Progress Party
 Progress Party (Grenada)
 Progress Party (Iraq)
 Progress Party (Jersey)
 Progress Party (Norway)
 Progress Party (Russia)

Former parties
 Australian Capital Territory Progress and Welfare Council
 Progress Party (Australia)
 Christian People's Party (Faroe Islands)
 German Progress Party
 Progress Party (Ghana)
 Progress Party (Iran)
 Progress Party (Norway, 1957)
 Progress Party (Sweden)
 Progress Party (Thailand, 1983)

See also
Progressive Party (disambiguation)
Progressive Conservative Party of Canada
Progressive Democratic Party (disambiguation)
Progressive Green Party (disambiguation)
Progress (disambiguation)

it:Partito del Progresso